Mao Rubai (born May 1938) is a Chinese politician who served as party secretary of Ningxia from 1997 to 2002 and chairman of Ningxia People's Congress from 1998 to 2002. He also served as chairperson of the National People's Congress Environment Protection and Resources Conservation Committee from 2003 to 2008.

He was a member of the 15th Central Committee of the Chinese Communist Party. He was a delegate to the 9th National People's Congress.

Early life and education

Mao was born in Yangzhou, Jiangsu, in May 1938. He secondary studied at Yangzhou High School of Jiangsu Province. In 1955, he entered Nanjing University, majoring in the Department of Meteorology.

Career in Tibet
He joined the Chinese Communist Party (CCP) in November 1959. He was assigned to the Meteorological Bureau of Tibet Autonomous Region in August 1961, becoming director in December 1980. He was appointed deputy party secretary of Tibet Autonomous Region in December 1984, concurrently serving as vice chairman of Tibet Autonomous Region since March 1986.

Ministry of Construction
In April 1993, he was transferred to Beijing and appointed .

Career in Ningxia
He was chosen as party secretary of Ningxia in August 1997, concurrently serving as chairman of Ningxia People's Congress since May 1998.

National People's Congress
He became vice chairperson of the National People's Congress Environment Protection and Resources Conservation Committee in April 2002, and was promoted to chairperson in March 2003.

References

1938 births
Living people
People from Yangzhou
Nanjing University alumni
People's Republic of China politicians from Jiangsu
Chinese Communist Party politicians from Jiangsu
Members of the 15th Central Committee of the Chinese Communist Party
Delegates to the 9th National People's Congress